A rimshot is a percussion technique used to produce an accented snare drum backbeat. The sound is produced by simultaneously hitting the rim and head of a drum with a drum stick.

The sound and various techniques

The sound of rimshots can be described as "part normal snare and part loud, woody accent", or "generally sharper, brighter and more cutting [than a standard accent]", since the technique produces large amounts of overtones.

The stroke is used on the snare in rock, pop, and blues and on the tom-toms in Afro-Cuban music. The technique is also very common in bossa nova, ska, reggae and rocksteady.

In marching percussion there are three types of rimshots. The most common is the "normal" rimshot, which is played with the tip (bead) of the stick held about three inches from the rim. This produces a prominent, accented tone. The second is the "ping shot", where the bead is struck about one inch from the rim. This produces a high pitched sound. The third is a "gock" (also spelled gawk), which is produced by hitting the bead of the drum stick at the center of the drum while the rim is percussed with the distal shaft of the stick (near the hand). This makes a lower sound.

In orchestral percussion, a rimshot is performed by placing one drum stick with the stick head near the middle of the drumhead, and the shaft pressed against the rim, and striking with the other stick. This produces a less powerful sound, and is easier to execute than a typical rimshot. This variation is also known as a "stick shot".

The rimshot is often confused with the cross stick technique, in which the tip of a drumstick is placed on the head near one of the bearing edges and the shaft of the stick is struck against the rim opposite the tip, thus creating a dry, high pitched "click" similar to a set of claves. The stroke is used to simulate claves in Brazilian bossa nova and also used for ballads in rock, pop, and country.

More general use of the term
The musical phrase played on percussion instruments used to punctuate jokes is known in percussion jargon as a sting. This is often called a rimshot although some versions of it do not include a rimshot in the technical sense.

A rimshot when used to accent the punchline of a joke being told by a live comedian may or may not simultaneously be played with a small cymbal crash.  This was popularized in standup comedy by comedians performing at the resorts in the Catskill Mountains region.  Many of these comics were of Jewish heritage and were known as "Borscht Belt comics", after a vacation spot in the Catskills.

The best illustration of how a rimshot might be applied to a comedy routine is to look at the classic style of Henny Youngman who in addition to playing a violin would tell fast-paced, one-liner type of jokes.  His most famous line was  "Take my wife… please!"; after he said "please", it was the drummer's duty to play a rimshot to punctuate the humor and generate laughter from the audience.

Sometimes, the comedian would react to the rimshot as if he did not expect it and in doing so, pass the reaction and responsibility for the rimshot on to the drummer.  When in fact, the comedian had previously instructed the drummer when to use and when not to use the rimshot.  There was really nothing surprising about the use of the rimshot because they were scripted into the routine by the comedian, but were designed to appear to be improvised by the drummer.  And when the comedian jumped, or blinked or otherwise physically acted as if he was hit with a "slap" it would generally heighten the audience's response.  The cymbal and rimshot together, or the rimshot followed immediately by the cymbal crash all worked together to maximize the reaction to the joke.

References

Drum strokes
Percussion performance techniques